Darcy Olsen is an American nonprofit executive. She founded The Center for the Rights of Abused Children in 2017 to strengthen constitutional rights for abused children in foster care. For 15 years, she served as the chief executive officer of the Goldwater Institute. In 2015, she publishedThe Right to Try: How the Federal Government Prevents Americans from Getting the Lifesaving Treatments They Need.

Early life and education
Darcy Ann Olsen was born in Bennington, Vermont. Until she was ten years old, she and her family resided in Hoosick Falls, New York. Her family then moved to Richfield, Utah. Olsen attended high school in St. George, Utah, where she was active in student groups.

In 1989, Olsen received a scholarship to attend the Edmund A. Walsh School of Foreign Service at Georgetown University in Washington, D.C. While attending classes, Olsen also worked as a drug counselor and transition house manager for the Coalition for the Homeless.

In 1993, Olsen earned a bachelor of science degree from Edmund A. Walsh School of Foreign Service. Then she enrolled in graduate school at New York University. She earned a master's degree in international education in 1995 after studying foreign educational systems with an emphasis in developing countries of North Africa.

Career
After graduating from NYU, Olsen moved back to Utah and worked as a copywriter and editor for Weber State University. A year later, she returned to Washington, D.C. in a similar role for the Cato Institute, a libertarian think tank.

Cato Institute
Olsen's first report for Cato focused on an anticipated proposal from President Bill Clinton's administration to significantly expand the federal government's role in providing child care for American families.

Two years later, Olsen wrote a new report about proposals in a variety of states to provide universal preschool because of claims that at-risk children need a stable instructional environment at earlier ages to be successful in school as they get older. In her review of the available scientific research, Olsen wrote that government-sponsored early childhood education provides no lasting improvement in the average student's learning skills or chances for success later.

Goldwater Institute
Olsen moved to Phoenix in 2001 to lead the Goldwater Institute, a conservative and libertarian public policy think tank.

Olsen left the Goldwater Institute in July 2017 after serving as its CEO for 15 years. The Arizona Capital Times reported she was ousted by the board.

Honors and awards
She was named one of Arizona's top Women in Public Policy and one of the Phoenix Business Journal's Power Players in 2006, and one of Phoenix's Forty Under 40 in 2009. She also received the Roe Award, offered by the State Policy Network for outstanding achievements in advancing free-market philosophies. In 2014, she received the Bradley Prize, awarded each year by the Bradley Foundation.  In 2019, Olsen was the first winner of the Gregor G. Peterson Prize in Venture Philanthropy. She was selected from a pool of more than 60 nonprofits nationally.

Personal life
Olsen is a foster mother who has adopted four children through the foster care system.

She has written columns for national newspapers including The Wall Street Journal and USA Today and appeared on public affairs television programs across the country including The O'Reilly Factor, The Dennis Miller Show and Inside Politics. Glenn Beck included Olsen's thoughts in his 2009-10 American Revival Tour.

References

External links
 
 The Center for the Rights of Abused Children

Year of birth missing (living people)
Living people
American women chief executives
Walsh School of Foreign Service alumni
New York University alumni
People from Hoosick Falls, New York
People from Richfield, Utah
People from St. George, Utah
21st-century American women